Amjad Javed (born 5 July 1980) is a former cricketer who played for the United Arab Emirates national cricket team. He is an allrounder who bats with right-hand and bowls right-arm medium. He is one of the few cricketers for UAE  who had played Asia Cup. Amjad Javed's grandfather moved to Dubai from Lahore, Pakistan 50 years ago, when his father was only 2 years old. Amjad Javed is of Pakistani descent but born and raised in UAE. He also worked for Emirates airlines as a baggage handler. Amjad took retirement from all forms of cricket on 22 December 2018.

Playing career

He made his One Day International debut for the United Arab Emirates against Bangladesh at Gaddafi Stadium in 2008 Asia Cup. He scored 10 runs in which he hit a four and six and then bowled two overs without any success.

In World Cup Qualifier, Javed hit a blistering 164 from 117 balls, laced with 17 fours and eight sixes at  Senwes Park in Potchefstroom as the UAE completed a 112-run win over Denmark.

In 2010, in a List-A match against Bermuda, Javed hit blitzed 89 off 59 balls which included seven fours and five sixes as UAE extended their domination over Bermuda with a thumping 134-run win at the National Stadium.

In 2012, Javed finished with the best figures 4 for 49 against Netherlands in the Intercontinental Cup played at Deventer.

In the 2015 ICC World Cup Qualifier, Javed blasted a 31-ball 63 to lift the team to 246 for 8 as United Arab Emirates held their nerve to secure a narrow 13-run win against Kenya at Hagley Oval in Christchurch, putting an end to Kenya's hopes of extending their streak of five consecutive World Cup appearances.

In the 2015 ICC Cricket World Cup clash v Ireland, he along with Shaiman Anwar set the highest ever World Cup record partnership of 107 runs for the 7th wicket. In fact, this pair of batsmen became the first pair to have had a 100+ runstand for the 7th wicket in World Cup history.

Just after a month later, in the 2015 ICC Cricket World Cup, Amjad Javed along with Nasir Aziz put on a 107 run stand against West Indies for the 7th wicket and created history for the joint highest ever World Cup 7th wicket partnership. Javed is the only player in the world to involve in more than one 100+ stand for the 7th wicket in Cricket World Cup history.

He holds the record for facing the most number of balls in a T20I innings when batting at number seven position(46)

References

External links 

1980 births
Living people
Sportspeople from Dubai
United Arab Emirates One Day International cricketers
United Arab Emirates Twenty20 International cricketers
Emirati cricketers
Cricketers at the 2015 Cricket World Cup
Pakistani expatriate sportspeople in the United Arab Emirates
Emirati cricket captains